The Tri-City Dust Devils are a Minor League Baseball team based in Pasco, Washington. The Dust Devils are members of the Northwest League and are affiliated with the Los Angeles Angels. Tri-City plays their home games at Gesa Stadium, which opened in 1995 and has a seating capacity of 3,654.

History 
In 1999 a  group called Portland Family Entertainment claimed the Portland territory for AAA franchise. The Portland Rockies had been playing in the Rose City since 1995. Portland Family Entertainment, who had purchased the Albuquerque Dukes franchise would be relocating to Portland for the 2000 season. On July 10 long time owner Jack Cain, who had owned the Rockies franchise dating back to the Bend Phillies, sold the franchise to Portland Family Entertainment. Forced to vacate Portland with arrival of the AAA club, the franchise moved up the Columbia River to the Tri-Cities area.

Upon relocating to the Tri-Cities the team adopted a new unique nickname, Dust Devils. Vice President and general manager Derrel Ebert “We’re pretty big in the agricultural industries around here. With all the farms and all the dirt, we also have a high amount of wind that comes through. We literally get dirt devils, dust devils, those types of mini-tornado type things that come barreling through here at times.”

In their inaugural season the Dust Devils compiled a record of 39-36 to finish second in the north division standings. Despite a losing record, Tri-City won their first division title in 2007. The Dust Devils faced Salem-Keizer in the championship series, but fell to the Volcanoes in four games.

In 2015 the Dust Devils ended their long standing affiliation with the Colorado Rockies. Tri-City signed a player development contract with the San Diego Padres.

Due to the COVID-19 pandemic, the Minor League Baseball season was cancelled. In the winter of 2020 as part the reorganization of minor league baseball, Tri-City received an invitation to play as High-A affiliate of Los Angeles Angels. In a further change, they were organized into the High-A West along with five other teams previously of the Northwest League. In 2022, the High-A West became known as the Northwest League, the name historically used by the regional circuit prior to the 2021 reorganization.

The Dust Devils' front office is headed up by president Brent Miles and vice president / general manager Derrel Ebert. Prior to Ebert taking over as VP/GM in September 2009, Monica Ortega held the position from 2008 to 2009 as the only female general manager in the Northwest League.  The principal owner of the team is hall of famer George Brett, with Miles as a minority owner.

Before the Dust Devils 
The Tri-Cities in southeastern Washington, which include Kennewick and Richland along with Pasco, have fielded a number of teams in the Northwest League and its predecessor, the Western International League. The Tri-City Braves were a member of the WIL from 1950 to 1955, when the team became a charter member of the new Northwest League.  The Tri-Cities were continually represented through 1974 under various names (Braves 1955–60, 1962; Angels 1961, 1963–64; Atoms 1965–68; A's 1969; Padres 1970–72; Triplets 1973; Ports 1974).

In 1974, the Ports were an independent team and went 27–57 and drew just 21,611 in home attendance for the season. The team was managed by owner Carl W. Thompson, Sr. before folding.

From 1950 through 1974, home games were held at Sanders-Jacobs Field in Kennewick, located at the northeast corner of Clearwater Avenue and Neel Street. The field was aligned to the northeast and named for Harry Sanders, a Connell farmer, and Tom Jacobs, a former manager and the general manager of the Atoms at the time of his death at age 64 in 1968. The ballpark  was demolished in the mid-1970s, shortly after the Ports folded.

The Tri-Cities were without baseball until 1983 when the Tri-Cities Triplets (an homage to the 1973 name) formed, though they only lasted until 1986. The Triplets had relocated from Walla Walla and were an affiliate of the Texas Rangers for the first two years, independent for the final two.  They played their home games at Richland High School baseball field, adjacent to the Bomber Bowl football stadium. The team was bought by the Brett brothers in February 1986, then sold that autumn to Diamond Sports, a group headed by the general manager, Mal Fichman. The Triplets relocated to Southwestern Idaho for the 1987 season and became the Boise Hawks.

The Tri-Cities was also home to the Tri-City Posse of the independent Western Baseball League from 1995 to 2000. The Posse were founded in the WBL's first year in 1995, won the league title in 1999, but folded after the 2000 season.

Identity 
The Dust Devils, who had continued their relationship with the Colorado Rockies, originally intended to keep purple as their team color. However, when the Dust Devils took the field they donned navy and khaki. The colors were derived from the local topography. "If you drive through the Tri-Cities there three main things you’ll notice, it’s in the desert, so the sky is huge, it’s big sky country, and that’s obviously blue; the Columbia River is the main geographic feature, and that’s a deep, dark blue; and the hills are kind of a brown, khaki color."

Ballpark 
The Dust Devils play their home games at Gesa Stadium, which opened in 1995 as Tri-City Stadium. Upon the arrival of the Dust Devils in 2001 the stadium was changed from its original name to Dust Devil Stadium. The stadium has a seating capacity of 3,654.

Season-by-season record

Roster

Notable alumni 

 Andy Ashby (1986) 2 x MLB All-Star
 Clint Barmes (2000)
 Charlie Blackmon (2008, 2012) 3 x MLB All-Star; 2017 NL Batting Title
 Shawn Chacon (1996) MLB All-Star
 Aaron Cook (1998) MLB All-Star
 Craig Counsell (1992)
 Gary Disarcina (1988) MLB All-Star
 Damion Easley (1989) MLB All-Star
 Jim Edmonds (1988) 4 x MLB All-Star
 Chone Figgins (1998) MLB All-Star
 Ty France (2015) MLB All-Star
 Jeff Francis (2002)
 Julio Franco (1979) 3 x MLB All-Star; 1991 AL Batting Title
 Jason Grimsley (1985)
 Brad Hawpe (2000) MLB All-Star
 Chris James (1982)
 Jason Jennings (1999) 2002 NL Rookie of the Year
 Mike Maddux (1982)
 Quinton McCracken (1992)
 Neifi Pérez (1993)
 Juan Pierre (1998)
 Tim Salmon (1989) 1993 AL Rookie of the Year
 Juan Samuel (1980) 3 x MLB All-Star
 Rick Schu (1981)
 Trevor Story (2014) MLB All-Star
 Pedro Strop (2004–2005)
 Fernando Tatis, Jr. (2016)
 John Thomson (2000)
 Jake Westbrook (1996) MLB All-Star
 Russell Wilson (2010) NFL Quarterback

Former players 
Tri-City Dust Devils players   (2001–present)

References

External links 
 
 Statistics from Baseball-Reference

Sports in the Tri-Cities, Washington
Professional baseball teams in Washington (state)
Colorado Rockies minor league affiliates
Los Angeles Angels minor league affiliates
San Diego Padres minor league affiliates
Pasco, Washington
Northwest League teams
High-A West teams